The 2003 Golden Spin of Zagreb was the 36th edition of an annual senior-level international figure skating competition held in Zagreb, Croatia. It was held between November 12 and 15, 2003. Figure skaters competed in the disciplines of men's singles, ladies' singles, pair skating, and ice dancing. The Junior-level equivalent was the 2003 Golden Bear of Zagreb.

Results

Men

Ladies

Pairs

Ice dancing

External links
 36th Golden Spin of Zagreb

Golden Spin Of Zagreb, 2003
Golden Spin of Zagreb
2000s in Zagreb
Golden Spin Of Zagreb, 2003